Fatty alcohols (or long-chain alcohols) are usually high-molecular-weight, straight-chain primary alcohols, but can also range from as few as 4–6 carbons to as many as 22–26, derived from natural fats and oils. The precise chain length varies with the source. Some commercially important fatty alcohols are lauryl, stearyl, and oleyl alcohols. They are colourless oily liquids (for smaller carbon numbers) or waxy solids, although impure samples may appear yellow. Fatty alcohols usually have an even number of carbon atoms and a single alcohol group (–OH) attached to the terminal carbon. Some are unsaturated and some are branched. They are widely used in industry. As with fatty acids, they are often referred to generically by the number of carbon atoms in the molecule, such as "a C12 alcohol", that is an alcohol having 12 carbons, for example dodecanol.

Production and occurrence
Fatty alcohols became commercially available in the early 1900s. They were originally obtained by reduction of wax esters with sodium by the Bouveault–Blanc reduction process. In the 1930s catalytic hydrogenation was commercialized, which allowed the conversion of fatty acid esters, typically tallow, to the alcohols. In the 1940s and 1950s, petrochemicals became an important source of chemicals, and Karl Ziegler had discovered the polymerization of ethylene. These two developments opened the way to synthetic fatty alcohols.

From natural sources
Most fatty alcohols in nature are found as waxes, which are esters of fatty acids and fatty alcohols. They are produced by bacteria, plants and animals for purposes of buoyancy, as source of metabolic water and energy, biosonar lenses (marine mammals) and for thermal insulation in the form of waxes (in plants and insects). 
The traditional sources of fatty alcohols have largely been various vegetable oils, which remain a large-scale feedstock. Animal fats (tallow) were of historic importance, particularly whale oil, however they are no longer used on a large scale. Tallows produce a fairly narrow range of alcohols, predominantly C16–C18, while plant sources produce a wider range of alcohols from (C6–C24), making them the preferred source. The alcohols are obtained from the triglycerides (fatty acid triesters), which form the bulk of the oil. The process involves the transesterification of the triglycerides to give methyl esters which are then hydrogenated to produce the fatty alcohols. Higher alcohols (C20–C22) can be obtained from rapeseed oil or mustard seed oil. Midcut alcohols are obtained from coconut oil (C12–C14) or palm kernel oil (C16–C18).

From petrochemical sources
Fatty alcohols are also prepared from petrochemical sources. In the Ziegler process, ethylene is oligomerized using triethylaluminium followed by air oxidation. This process affords even-numbered alcohols:
Al(C2H5)3 + 18 C2H4 → Al(C14H29)3
Al(C14H29)3 +  O2 +  H2O → 3 HOC14H29 +  Al2O3

Alternatively ethylene can be oligomerized to give mixtures of alkenes, which are subjected to hydroformylation, this process affording odd-numbered aldehyde, which is subsequently hydrogenated. For example, from 1-decene, hydroformylation gives the C11 alcohol:
C8H17CH=CH2 + H2 + CO → C8H17CH2CH2CHO
C8H17CH2CH2CHO + H2 → C8H17CH2CH2CH2OH
In the Shell higher olefin process, the chain-length distribution in the initial mixture of alkene oligomers is adjusted so as to more closely match market demand. Shell does this by means of an intermediate metathesis reaction. The resultant mixture is fractionated and hydroformylated/hydrogenated in a subsequent step.

Applications
Fatty alcohols are mainly used in the production of detergents and surfactants. They are components also of cosmetics, foods, and as industrial solvents. Due to their amphipathic nature, fatty alcohols behave as nonionic surfactants. They find use as co-emulsifiers, emollients and thickeners in cosmetics and food industry. About 50% of fatty alcohols used commercially are of natural origin, the remainder being synthetic.

Nutrition
Very long-chain fatty alcohols (VLCFA), obtained from plant waxes and beeswax have been reported to lower plasma cholesterol in humans. They can be found in unrefined cereal grains, beeswax, and many plant-derived foods. Reports suggest that 5–20 mg per day of mixed C24–C34 alcohols, including octacosanol and triacontanol, lower low-density lipoprotein (LDL) cholesterol by 21%–29% and raise high-density lipoprotein cholesterol by 8%–15%. Wax esters are hydrolyzed by a bile salt–dependent pancreatic esterase, releasing long-chain alcohols and fatty acids that are absorbed in the gastrointestinal tract. Studies of fatty alcohol metabolism in fibroblasts suggest that very long-chain fatty alcohols, fatty aldehydes, and fatty acids are reversibly inter-converted in a fatty alcohol cycle. The metabolism of these compounds is impaired in several inherited human peroxisomal disorders, including adrenoleukodystrophy and Sjögren–Larsson syndrome.

Safety

Human health
Fatty alcohols are relatively benign materials, with LD50 (oral, rat) ranging from 3.1–4 g/kg for hexanol to 6–8 g/kg for octadecanol. For a 50 kg person, these values translate to more than 100 g. Tests of acute and repeated exposures have revealed a low level of toxicity from inhalation, oral or dermal exposure of fatty alcohols. Fatty alcohols are not very volatile and the acute lethal concentration is greater than the saturated vapor pressure. Longer-chain (C12–C16) fatty alcohols produce fewer health effects than short-chain (smaller than C12). Short-chain fatty alcohols are considered eye irritants, while long chain alcohols are not. Fatty alcohols exhibit no skin sensitization.

Repeated exposure to fatty alcohols produce low-level toxicity and certain compounds in this category can cause local irritation on contact or low-grade liver effects (essentially linear alcohols have a slightly higher rate of occurrence of these effects). No effects on the central nervous system have been seen with inhalation and oral exposure. Tests of repeated bolus dosages of 1-hexanol and 1-octanol showed potential for CNS depression and induced respiratory distress. No potential for peripheral neuropathy has been found. In rats, the no observable adverse effect level (NOAEL) ranges from 200 mg/kg/day to 1000 mg/kg/day by ingestion. There has been no evidence that fatty alcohols are mutagenic or cause reproductive toxicity or infertility. Fatty alcohols are effectively eliminated from the body when exposed, limiting possibility of retention or bioaccumulation.

Margins of exposure resulting from consumer uses of these chemicals are adequate for the protection of human health as determined by the Organisation for Economic Co-operation and Development (OECD) high production volume chemicals program.

Environment
Fatty alcohols up to chain length C18 are biodegradable, with length up to C16 biodegrading within 10 days completely. Chains C16 to C18 were found to biodegrade from 62% to 76% in 10 days. Chains greater than C18 were found to degrade by 37% in 10 days. Field studies at wastewater treatment plants have shown that 99% of fatty alcohols lengths C12–C18 are removed.

Fate prediction using fugacity modeling has shown that fatty alcohols with chain lengths of C10 and greater in water partition into sediment. Lengths C14 and above are predicted to stay in the air upon release. Modeling shows that each type of fatty alcohol will respond independently upon environmental release.

Aquatic organisms
Fish, invertebrates and algae experience similar levels of toxicity with fatty alcohols although it is dependent on chain length with the shorter chain having greater toxicity potential. Longer chain lengths show no toxicity to aquatic organisms.

This category of chemicals was evaluated under the Organisation for Economic Co-operation and Development (OECD) high production volume chemicals program. No unacceptable environmental risks were identified.

Table with common names
This table lists some alkyl alcohols. Note that in general the alcohols with even numbers of carbon atoms have common names, since they are found in nature, whereas those with odd numbers of carbon atoms generally do not have a common name.

References

External links
  General overview of fatty alcohols, with references.
 

 
Lipids
Commodity chemicals